USCS Baltimore was a schooner that served as a survey ship in the United States Coast Survey from 1851 to 1858.

The Coast Survey acquired Baltimore in 1851 for the use of the hydrographic surveying party of Richard D. Cutts while it was working on the central California coast. She spent her career operating along the United States West Coast and was retired in 1858.

References
NOAA History, A Science Odyssey: Tools of the Trade: Ships: Coast and Geodetic Survey Ships: Baltimore

Ships of the United States Coast Survey
Survey ships of the United States
Schooners
Sailing ships of the United States
1850s ships